Barton is a town in southwestern Tioga County, New York, United States. The population was 8,570 at the 2020 census. It is southeast of Elmira.

History 
The Sullivan Expedition of 1779 passed through this region. The first settlers arrived circa 1791.

The Town of Barton was established in 1824 from the town of Tioga. The region was already settled in 1796 when John Shepard bought  by the current location of Waverly. It is reported that the town was named after Belva Ann Lockwood of Royalton, New York (near Lockport), one of the first female lawyers in the country, the first woman to argue a case before the Supreme Court and the first woman to be on an official ballot running for president of the US in 1884 and 1888.

One of the most interesting points in the town was the J.E. Rodeo Ranch." The 1940s and 1950s were also the heyday of Colonel Jim Eskew's famous J. E. Rodeo organization, the only rodeo ranch east of the Mississippi River. The rodeo traveled throughout the Mid Atlantic and New England states.

Geography

Part of the southern town line is the Susquehanna River and the remainder is the state line of Pennsylvania. The western town boundary is the border of Chemung County.

The Southern Tier Expressway (New York State Route 17) passes across the town next to the Susquehanna River. New York State Route 17C also follows the river, but on the north side.  New York State Route 34 is a north-south highway that intersects NY-17C at Waverly.

Demographics

As of the census of 2000, there were 9,066 people, 3,568 households, and 2,383 families residing in the town.  The population density was 152.7 people per square mile (59.0/km2).  There were 3,927 housing units at an average density of 66.2 per square mile (25.5/km2).  The racial makeup of the town was 98.10% White, 0.39% African American, 0.25% Native American, 0.40% Asian, 0.15% from other races, and 0.71% from two or more races. Hispanic or Latino of any race were 1.03% of the population.

There were 3,568 households, out of which 33.0% had children under the age of 18 living with them, 50.3% were married couples living together, 12.1% had a female householder with no husband present, and 33.2% were non-families. 27.4% of all households were made up of individuals, and 12.4% had someone living alone who was 65 years of age or older.  The average household size was 2.47 and the average family size was 3.00.

In the town, the population was spread out, with 26.0% under the age of 18, 7.4% from 18 to 24, 28.5% from 25 to 44, 21.9% from 45 to 64, and 16.2% who were 65 years of age or older.  The median age was 38 years. For every 100 females, there were 91.1 males.  For every 100 females age 18 and over, there were 86.7 males.

The median income for a household in the town was $33,530, and the median income for a family was $39,650. Males had a median income of $30,828 versus $23,351 for females. The per capita income for the town was $15,498.  About 7.8% of families and 10.5% of the population were below the poverty line, including 12.2% of those under age 18 and 4.6% of those age 65 or over.

Communities and locations in the Town of Barton 
Barton – The hamlet of Barton in the southeast part of the town is located on the north side of the Susquehanna River and NY-17C.  The community has been referred to as "Barton City."
East Waverly – A hamlet on the east side of Waverly.
Ellistown - A hamlet on NY-17C east of Waverly on the north side of the Susquehanna River.
Glencairn –  A hamlet in the southeast part of the town on County Road 9.
Halsey Valley – A hamlet on the town line in the northeast part of the town.
Lockwood –  A hamlet by the west town line on NY-34. It was formerly called "Bingham's Mills" from the names of early settlers.  The present name is after Belva Ann Lockwood, a prominent suffragist who taught school for three years in nearby Owego.
Lockwood Run – A stream at the west town line that flows through Waverly.
North Barton – A hamlet centrally located in the north part of the town.
North Waverly – A community adjacent to the north side of Waverly on NY-34.
Reniff –  A hamlet by the west town line on NY-34 north of Lockwood.
Waverly – The Village of Waverly is in the southwest corner of the town on the border of Pennsylvania. It is north of Sayre, Pennsylvania.
It was Bingham's Mills first founded by Charles Bingham in the 1700. The name was changed by a local politician who had a falling out with the Bingham's.
They had their own Mills, general store, Post Office, etc. that would be found in a small town.
This family can be traced back to England. Upon leaving Bingham England settled in Holland for a period of time prior to coming to the United States in the 1600 and settling in NYC. lower Manhattan. Branches of this family went on to Maine and owned over 100,000 acres of land. What remains is Bingham Maine.
Charles Bingham,. who was one of the first settlers on Cayuta creek, was a pioneer in the Wyoming Valley but was driven from that region by the Indians. He returned to Wilkesbarre, but after dangerous hostilities had passed came to the vicinity of Spanish Hill,- and still later moved to a home about six miles up Shepard's Creek. Mr. Bingham was noted for his maple sugar product; indeed the abundance of sugar maples on the tract was the inducement to him to make the purchase. Charles Bingham, son of the settler, built an early mill on the site now of Bingham Brothers' mill at Lockwood. Charles Bingham the elder, had four sons, John, Ebenezer, Jonathan and Charles, Jr., and three daughters, Anna, Margurite and Sarah. -

Thus was the pioneer and early settlement accomplished in this western portion of the old town of Owego. The reader must of course understand that the original town of Owego included all the territory between Owego creek on the east and the Cayuta creek on the west. This name was continued from the time of the erection of the county in 1791 to the time of the general revision of both counties and towns in the state in 1813. Then the town previously known as Tioga took the name of Owego, and Owego 'thenceforth became known as Tioga. Therefore, all settlers in Barton before 1813 were in Owego, and between the year last mentioned and March 23, 1824, all who came to what we now call Barton were settlers in Tioga. - However, before proceeding to a discussion of the civil and political history of the town we may with propriety recall the names of other and perhaps later settlers in Barton, but who were in some manner identified with its history. Still, this mention must be brief in view of the fact that- in another department of this work, devoted solely to personal chronology, the reader will find more extended allusion, to pioneers and as well to other substantial families of the town, whether early or more recent settlers.
Lockwood, as now known, owes its existence and business im portance almost wholly to the efforts of the firm of Bingham Brothers, who began operations here soon after the close of the war. However, in the early history of the town Charles Bingham, Jr., son of the pioneer Charles, built a mill at Lockwood, or on the site of the subsequent hamlet so called. In. later years the place came to be known as Bingham's Mills, and was so called until 1881, when on account of a political difference between the proprietors in fact of the place and a government official, the official having the power, caused the name to be changed from Bingham's Mills to Lockwood. The date of the change was November 18, 1881.

The post office was established January 7, 1870. and the postmasters have been George W. Bingham, appointed January 7, 1870, and November 18, 1881; George D. Brock, August 24, 1885; Edmund J. Bingham, May 2, 1889; Ezra Canfield, August 23, 1893. A part of the extensive mills at this place which Bingham Brothers operate was burned in December, 1896, but was at once replaced with others. Therefore, the business interests of Lockwood are about as substantial as ever, and are represented as follows: Bingham Brothers, general merchants, manufacturers of butter packages and proprietors of saw, planing and grist mills; Truman Searles, grocer; W. E. Edgerton, dealer in agricultural implements and proprietor of meat market.

Notable residents
Jeff Foote, professional basketball player

References

External links
 Town of Barton
  Barton history

Binghamton metropolitan area
Towns in Tioga County, New York